The Institut océanographique de Paris, is an oceanographic institution founded in 1906 by Albert I, Prince of Monaco, which also includes the Oceanographic Museum of Monaco. The building was designated as a Monument historique in 2004. In 2011, for the 100 year anniversary, it was renamed the Maison des océans.

History

Origin
The organization's founder, Albert I, Prince of Monaco, wanted to spread his knowledge and interest in oceanography, and as early as 1903 began teaching classes of the subject at the Conservatoire national des arts et métiers. The classes were successful, and led to the creation of the Oceanographic Institute in Paris, as well as the formation of the Institut océanographique organization in 1906.

Construction

The oceanographic institute was built in 1908 and completed in 1911. It is located in the 5th arrondissement of Paris near the Latin Quarter, on the corner of Rue Saint-Jacques and Rue Gay-Lussac, in the "Campus Curie", which includes other scientific institutions.

The building was designed by architect Henri-Paul Nénot, who also designed the nearby Sorbonne and the neighboring . The latter is linked by a symbolic double arch (the Earth and the Ocean) to the Oceanographic Institute. The building's style is an Italian Renaissance palace in brick and stone, flanked by a tall square tower, which is similar to many others in the area.

This building includes two amphitheatres, three laboratories corresponding to three courses (physical oceanography, marine biology and physiology of marine biodiversity), a specialized library-media library, breeding grounds in the basement and official accommodation (managerial apartment and caretaker's studio).

Gallery

References

Oceanographic organizations
Monuments historiques of Paris
Educational institutions established in 1906
Buildings and structures in the 5th arrondissement of Paris
1906 establishments in France